Alastair Craig Paterson  CBE, FREng (15 January 1924 – 20 July 2021) was a British civil engineer. Born in Glasgow, Scotland, he was the 124th President of the Institution of Civil Engineers from November 1988 to November 1989 and President of the Institution of Structural Engineers from 1984 to 1985.

Career
After graduating from the Royal Technical College, Glasgow in 1944, Paterson joined the Royal Electrical and Mechanical Engineers and reached the rank of Major.  He completed his service in 1948 having gained the position of Deputy Assistant Director Mechanical Engineering (North Burma and China).

In 1948 Paterson joined Merz & McLelland in Esher, then Aberdeen.  In 1958 he left to join Taylor Woodrow working with Frank Gibb on nuclear power station projects.

He became a partner of F R Bullen in 1960 and founded their Glasgow office. He was involved in the structural engineering of the Aberdeen School of Art. In 1966 he moved to London becoming Senior Partner and worked on projects such as Dungeness B power station and Aber Swing Bridge, Carnaerfon.

He became Chairman of the British Consultants' Bureau in 1976. He was President of the Institution of Structural Engineers from 1984 to 1985, and President of the Institution of Civil Engineers from November 1988 to November 1989.

Paterson died in Chichester in July 2021 at the age of 97.

References

1924 births
2021 deaths
Alumni of the University of Strathclyde
Engineers from Glasgow
Presidents of the Institution of Civil Engineers
Scottish civil engineers
Royal Electrical and Mechanical Engineers officers
British Army personnel of World War II